The Jama Masjid, commonly known as the Jama Masjid Rahmaniya, is the oldest mosque in Rupandehi, Bhairahawa, Nepal. It is the largest and best known mosque in Rupandehi District of Nepal. It was completed in 1950 AD (2007 BS).

Madarsa Arbiya Asharfiya Faizul Islam

The oldest Islamic school of Nepal is Madarsa Arabiya Ahsariya Faizul Islam. It was established in 1950 AD (2007 BS). The present principal of this Madarsaa (Islamic School) is Maulana Faizullah Asharfi. About 200 students are studying at present time among them 20 students dakhila (in hostel). This is the only Islamic school in the area which provides free Islamic education, food, and accommodation to dakhila students. Subjects for students are Arabic, Farsi (Parsian), Urdu, English, Nepali, Mathematics, Science, Social Studies, Economic etc. Madarsha is also affiliated with the Government of Nepal. All the teachers in Madarsa are qualified paid.

The Madarsa Currently offers the following Islamic courses
 Hifz-ul-Quraan
 Aalim Course
 Ustaadh Training Course or Mawlawi
 Imam Khatib Training
 Ifta
 Sab’ah Qiraat

Imam of the Mosque Rahmaniya
The first Imam of the mosque rahmaniya was Maulana Ishaq Shahab from Bankatwa, Uttar Pradesh (India), second Imam was Master Maulvi Nasruddin Ansari from Lar, (India) and then after Maulana Faizullah Asharfih is the present Imam since 1973 AD.

Ahle Sunnat Wa Jamat Anjuman Islamiya Committee
Ahle Sunnat Wa Jamat Anjuman Islamiya Committee (Hindi:अहले सुन्नत व जमात अन्जुमन इस्लामिया कमिटी, Urdu:اہلسنت و جماعت انجمن اسلامیہ کمیٹی) is an Islamic Social Organization which was established by the local Muslim people of Bhairahawa, Nepal during 1950. Later it was registered with local government in 1996 (2053 BS). The committee is established to help the Muslim society.  Ahle Sunnat Wa Jamat Anjuman Islamiya Committee is a group of 13 members. All the members are elected by the local Muslim peoples for their position. All members are responsible for their position. It is one of the oldest Islamic committee registered in local government in Nepal. Committee responsible for maintenance and management of the Jama Masjid Rahmaniya (Mosque Rahmaniya), Madarsa Arabiya Asharfiya Faizul Islam (Islamic school), Eid Gah Sharif, Karbala and Cemetery (Kabristan). General Mission of this committee is to provide better Islamic education to adult and children and orphan children, vocations education, computer education and training, Hostel facility for boys, welfare works, Da’wah of Deen Islam and Religious program, welfare program for care-taking of orphans, Financial assistance program, sanitation program, the iftar program etc.

See also
List of mosques in Nepal

References

External links

 Location Map to Jama Masjid Rahmaniya
 Facebook page

Barelvi mosques
Mosques in Nepal
1950 establishments in Nepal